Noble Banadda (14 May 1975 – 1 July 2021) was a Ugandan biosystems engineer, researcher and academic, who was a professor of biosystems engineering at Makerere University, Uganda's largest and oldest public university. He was appointed a full professor in 2012 at age 37, one of the youngest persons in the history of the university to attain full professorship.

He died from complications of COVID-19 Kampala, Uganda, on 1 July 2021.

Early life and education
Banadda was born in Kampala, Uganda's capital city on 14 May 1975. After attending local primary and secondary schools, he was admitted to Sokoine University of Agriculture, in Morogoro, Tanzania, graduating with a Bachelor of Science in Food Science and Technology.

His Master of Science degree in process engineering, together with his Doctor of Philosophy degree in chemical engineering, were both obtained from Katholieke Universiteit Leuven, in Leuven, Belgium. Later he studied in a post-doctoral fellowship at the Massachusetts Institute of Technology, in the United States.

He was the first sub-Saharan African person to graduate with a PhD in Chemical Engineering from the Katholieke Universiteit-Leuven in Belgium. Banadda was a Visiting Research Fellow at the University of Cambridge, United Kingdom.

Career
Banadda had a trailblazing scientific career. He was hired by Makerere University, serving in the Department of Agricultural and Biosystems Engineering, in the College of Agricultural and Environmental Sciences. In 2012, he was appointed a full professor at age 37.

Noble was the first African recipient of the Pius XI Golden Medal (2018) awarded by Pope Francis in Vatican (http://www.xn--academiadascincias 6wb.va/content/accademia/en/about/medal.html); a laureate of the Next Einstein Fellowship (https://nef.org/fellow/noble-banadda); Oliver Reginald Tambo Research Chair (https://www.nrf.ac.za/media-room/news/ortarchi-meet-team-aiming-contribute-transforming-african-research-landscape); honoured young scientist at the World Economic Forum; alumni of the Global Young Academy (2013 -2018) (https://globalyoungacademy.net/noble-banadda/); Member of the Malabo Panel of Experts (www.mamopanel.org); fellow of the Uganda National Academy of Sciences; council member of the Pan African Society for Agricultural Engineering (www.pasae.org.za); Member of the Makerere University Senate; adjunct professor at Iowa State University (US) (https://www.engineering.iastate.edu/people/affiliation/faculty/page/5/); research fellow at Clare Hall at University of Cambridge (UK); college member of the UKRI GCRF programme. Noble was full-time professor and chair of the department of Agricultural and Bio-Systems Engineering (ABE) at Makerere University (Uganda).

His research focus areas were in the biosystems engineering field and include mathematical modelling of biological systems and interactions. His goal was to create value-added products from solid biowaste resources.

Other consideration
Noble was favourably cited with thus far published research findings in over 240 peer-reviewed journal scientific publications. He also (co)-supervised 12 PhD students to completion and 31 M.Sc. students.

See also
Nelson Sewankambo
Philippa Ngaju Makobore
Makerere University

References

1975 births
2021 deaths
Ganda people
Ugandan engineers
Ugandan Roman Catholics
Ugandan chemical engineers
Academic staff of Makerere University
Sokoine University of Agriculture alumni
KU Leuven alumni
Massachusetts Institute of Technology alumni
People from Central Region, Uganda
Fellows of Uganda National Academy of Sciences
Deaths from the COVID-19 pandemic in Uganda